"You Want It, You Got It" is a song written by Abrim Tilmon and performed by The Detroit Emeralds.  The song was produced by Katouzzion and arranged by Abrim Tilmon and Johnny Allen.

Background
The song was featured on their 1972 album, You Want It, You Got It.

Chart performance
In 1972, "You Want It, You Got It" reached #5 on the R&B chart, and #36 on the Billboard Hot 100, and outside the US, the song peaked at #12 on the UK Singles Chart.

Popular culture
The song was featured in The Blind Side.

References

1971 songs
1971 singles
The Detroit Emeralds songs